The 2004 Daytona 500, the 46th running of the event was the first race of the 2004 NASCAR Nextel Cup season. It was a race held on February 15, 2004, at Daytona International Speedway in Daytona Beach, Florida. The race was televised by NBC, with Allen Bestwick, 1975 race winner Benny Parsons, and Wally Dallenbach Jr. calling the action for the second time after the 2002 race. It was the first NASCAR Nextel Cup race to air in high definition.

Dale Earnhardt Jr. won the race, making this his first Daytona 500 victory exactly six years to the day after his father Dale Earnhardt, Sr. won his first and only Daytona 500 in the 1998 race. Tony Stewart finished second and rookie Scott Wimmer finished third.

Qualifying and Gatorade 125's

Greg Biffle won his first career Cup Series pole, but an engine change during Speedweeks forced him to go the rear of the field. The inside column of cars all moved up one row, promoting Dale Earnhardt Jr., who had won the first Gatorade 125, to the number one starting spot. Elliott Sadler won the second of the Gatorade 125s, after holding off two-time 500 winner Sterling Marlin. Of the 45 cars entered, the two who failed to qualify were Kirk Shelmerdine, driving his own #72 Ford Taurus, and ARCA veteran Andy Hillenburg in the #90 Ford Taurus, one of Junie Donlavey's final attempts at entering a Cup car. Andy Belmont was going to enter in the #95 for the Sadler Brothers but withdrew.

Race summary
Before the start of the race, several cars had to move to the rear of the field: engine changes for polesitter Greg Biffle, Ryan Newman, Ricky Craven, and 1990 race winner Derrike Cope. Rookie and NEXTEL Cup debutant Scott Riggs started from the rear in a backup car. This meant that Gatorade Duel #1 winner Dale Earnhardt Jr. took over the first starting spot and led the opening laps.

Mark Martin, coming off a disappointing season last year, exited the race with a blown engine on lap 8, which brought out the first caution. On lap 26, his Roush Racing teammate Jeff Burton joined him in the garage, likewise with an engine failure. Kevin Harvick made the first lead change on lap 30. Four laps later, Cope spun in turn 4, collecting Scott Riggs; this would bring out the second caution. After the first round of green-flag pit stops, Tony Stewart took the lead. He and Jimmie Johnson swapped it a few times while navigating lapped cars (most of them were at the "tail-end" of the lead lap, given that the lap 34 crash occurred during pit stops) before Earnhardt Jr. reclaimed the lead.

On lap 60, the third caution was flown when Rusty Wallace, Ken Schrader, and Jeff Green crashed on the backstretch. After the restart, Stewart and Earnhardt Jr. both battled for the lead until a huge crash occurred in the back straightaway on lap 71. This started when rookies Brian Vickers and Johnny Sauter made contact, collecting Marlin, Newman, defending 500 winner Michael Waltrip, John Andretti, Kevin Lepage, Terry Labonte; Johnny Benson Jr.; Scott Riggs, Robby Gordon, and Jamie McMurray. Waltrip got the worst of it, as his car went into the infield grass. Waltrip hit Robby Gordon which caused his left rear wheel to come off. The friction, combined with the fact that the rains that had washed out the Busch race the day before, caused the tire rim to dig into the infield grass. The car flipped over three times, kicked up a lot of dirt, and came to a stop on its roof. A temporary delay under a long caution (although the race was not red-flagged) ensued as emergency crews debated whether or not too upright Waltrip's car before extricating him. The situation was exacerbated due to Waltrip's size.

Jeff Gordon led the field at the lap 81 restart. From laps, 81 to 200 were run caution-free. The main competitors during the second half of the race still were Stewart and Earnhardt Jr., who combined led 101 of the final 120 laps. They were the two strongest cars of the day, as they led for more than 156 laps (98 by Stewart and 56 by Earnhardt Jr.). When the leaders pitted at lap 137, Sauter (who was five laps down after damage to his car from the lap 71 crash) tried to pit with them but had evident braking issues. He had to swerve to miss Kurt Busch (who was one lap down after contact with Earnhardt Jr. earlier in the race punctured a tire) and flew through the pitlane at over 100 mph. Wisely, he did not attempt to stop in his pit box and came around the track to try again. His speeding penalty dropped him further back. During the final round of green-flag pit stops with approximately 30 laps to go, Biffle tried to gain ground on the leaders at the pit entry but was quite evidently faster than the pack of cars running at pit lane speed. He dropped behind them prior to pitting, but his speeding penalty dropped him out of the Top 10 and from contention for the win.

When the final green-flag pit stops were over, rookie Scott Wimmer of Bill Davis Racing was out in front. The crew had only changed right-side tires, elevating him from a likely seventh or eighth-place finish to a chance to win. Unfortunately, he had no drafting partner and was caught up by the faster Stewart and Earnhardt Jr. with 25 laps to go. Earnhardt Jr. passed Stewart on lap 181 and held him off in the remaining laps to win his first Daytona 500. Earnhardt Jr. won the race exactly three years after his father's fatal crash on the final lap of the 2001 race, where Waltrip had won his first race which itself came three years after Earnhardt's win in the 1998 race.

This pattern of a driver with some connection to Earnhardt Jr. winning the Daytona 500 every three years (since Earnhardt, Sr.'s win in 1998) has continued. Kevin Harvick, who replaced Earnhardt after his death, won the 2007 race just barely beating Mark Martin. Jamie McMurray, driving for Earnhardt Ganassi, won the 2010 race. Hendrick Motorsports (team Earnhardt Jr. was in at that time) driver Jimmie Johnson won the 2013 race, though Earnhardt Jr. was 2nd in that race and won the 2014 race, just ten years later.

Results

Stat Wrap
Source:
Time of the Race: 3 hours, 11 minutes, 53 seconds (22 minutes, 58 seconds longer than Buddy Baker's 1980 record)
Average Speed: 172.284 mph (Baker's record: 177.602 mph)
Cautions: 4 for 23 laps
Laps 8-11 (oil from Martin's blown engine)
Laps 34-38 (Cope, Riggs turn 4 crash)
Laps 60-64 (Green, Schrader, Wallace backstretch crash)
Laps 72-80 (Andretti, Benson Jr.; R. Gordon, T. Labonte, Lepage, Marlin, McMurray, Newman, Riggs, Sauter, Vickers, Waltrip backstretch crash).
Lead Changes: 26 among 10 drivers; 
Dale Earnhardt Jr. (1-29) 
Kevin Harvick (30-35) 
Tony Stewart (36-39) 
Jimmie Johnson (40-41) 
Tony Stewart (42-43) 
Jimmie Johnson (44-52) 
Dale Earnhardt Jr. (53-58) 
Tony Stewart (59) 
Dale Earnhardt Jr. (60) 
Tony Stewart (61-71) 
Dale Earnhardt Jr. (72) 
Kyle Petty (73-77) 
Jeff Gordon (78-84) 
Tony Stewart (85-104) 
Jimmie Johnson (105-107) 
Matt Kenseth (108) 
John Andretti (109) 
Tony Stewart (110-136) 
Jeff Gordon (137) 
Matt Kenseth (138) 
Jimmie Johnson (139) 
Terry Labonte (140) 
Tony Stewart (141-168) 
Dale Earnhardt Jr. (169) 
Jimmie Johnson (170) 
Scott Wimmer* (171-175) 
Tony Stewart (176-180) 
Dale Earnhardt Jr. (181-200).
Led the Most Laps: Tony Stewart, 98 of 200 laps
Cars running at the finish: 31
Rookie of the race: Scott Wimmer
Dale Earnhardt Jr.'s win was the third Daytona 500 win for DEI, after Michael Waltrip's wins in 2001 and 2003. Overall, it was DEI's fifth Daytona race victory, counting Waltrip and Earnhardt Jr.'s Pepsi 400 victories.
For the third year in a row, the pole sitter, Greg Biffle, did not lead a lap.
Nextel Cup debuts: Brendan Gaughan, Kasey Kahne, and Scott Riggs.
Only Daytona 500 appearances: Larry Foyt.
Final Daytona 500 appearances: Johnny Benson, 2002 race winner Ward Burton, Ricky Craven, and Jimmy Spencer.

References

Daytona 500
Daytona 500
NASCAR races at Daytona International Speedway